Conasprella jaspidea pealii is a subspecies of sea snail, a marine gastropod mollusk in the family Conidae, the cone snails and their allies.

Like all species within the genus Conasprella, these cone snails are predatory and venomous. They are capable of "stinging" humans, therefore live ones should be handled carefully or not at all.

Distribution
This marine species occurs in the Caribbean Sea and off the Lesser Antilles.

References

 Green, J. 1830. Monograph of the cones of North America, including three new species. Transactions of the Albany Institute 1:121-125, pl. 3
 Tucker J.K. & Tenorio M.J. (2009) Systematic classification of Recent and fossil conoidean gastropods. Hackenheim: Conchbooks. 296 pp.

External links
 To World Register of Marine Species
 Cone Shells - Knights of the Sea
 

jaspidea pealii